Joseph William Keough (January 7, 1946 – September 9, 2019) was an American professional baseball player. He played in Major League Baseball as a right fielder from 1968 through 1973 for the Oakland Athletics, Kansas City Royals and the Chicago White Sox. Coming from a baseball family, he was the younger brother of Marty Keough and uncle of Matt Keough. He was the Kansas City Athletics' second round selection in the first-ever MLB amateur draft in June 1965, chosen one round behind Rick Monday, but ahead of Sal Bando and Gene Tenace.

Keough was born in Pomona, California, and attended Mt. San Antonio College. He had a promising debut with the Oakland Athletics at Yankee Stadium on August 7, 1968, when he hit a home run off Lindy McDaniel in his first major league at bat. After being the fourth player selected by the Royals in the 1968 Major League Baseball expansion draft, he was on the Opening Day roster when Kansas City played its first game in April 1969. Keough delivered a pinch-hit single in the bottom of the 12th inning of the inaugural contest, giving KC a 4–3 victory over the Minnesota Twins.

The following year, he worked his way into the everyday lineup, compiling a .322 average by late June. A severely broken leg sustained on June 28 ended his 1970 season.  He returned in 1971, posting career highs with 110 games played, 34 runs, 87 hits, 14 doubles, and 30 runs batted in.

He was traded in the winter of 1972 to the White Sox for outfielder Jim Lyttle and appeared in five games for Chicago in 1973.

In a six-season career, Keough was a .246 hitter with nine home runs and 81 RBI in 332 games. Defensively, he recorded a .983 fielding percentage playing at all three outfield positions and first base.

He died on September 9, 2019 in Miami, Florida

See also
Home run in first major league at bat

References

External links

Joe Keough at Pura Pelota (Venezuelan Professional Baseball League)

1946 births
2019 deaths
Arizona Instructional League Athletics players
Baseball players from California
Birmingham A's players
Burlington Bees players
Cardenales de Lara players
American expatriate baseball players in Venezuela
Chicago White Sox players
Iowa Oaks players
Kansas City Royals players
Leesburg A's players
Major League Baseball right fielders
Mt. SAC Mounties baseball players
Oakland Athletics players
Omaha Royals players
Sportspeople from Pomona, California
Tigres de Aragua players